Saint Macarius  may refer to:
 Macarius of Egypt, also known as "Macarius the Great" or "Macarius the Elder" 4th-century Egyptian monk
 Macarius of Alexandria (d. 395), Egyptian ascetic, known as "Macarius the Younger"
 Macarius of Jerusalem, 4th-century Bishop of Jerusalem
 Macarius of Unzha, 15th-century Russian monk
 Macarius-Symeon (949-1022), also known as "Pseudo-Macarius"
 Macarius, Metropolitan of Moscow (1482–1563)